Neohenricia sibbettii, called the coral plant, is a species of flowering plant in the genus Neohenricia, native to South Africa. A succulent, it has gained the Royal Horticultural Society's Award of Garden Merit.

References

Aizoaceae
Endemic flora of South Africa
Plants described in 1938
Taxa named by Louisa Bolus